Calodema is a genus of beetles in the family Buprestidae, tribe Stigmoderini, containing the following species:

Calodema annae Grasso, 2020
 Calodema bifasciata Neef de Sainval & Lander, 1993
 Calodema blairi Neef de Sainval & Lander, 1994
 Calodema hanloni Nylander, 2008
 Calodema hudsoni Neef de Sainval, 1998
 Calodema longitarsis Nylander, 2008
 Calodema mariettae Nylander, 1993
 Calodema plebeia Jordan, 1895
 Calodema regalis (Gory & Laporte, 1838)
 Calodema ribbei van de Poll, 1885
 Calodema rubrimarginata Barker, 1993
 Calodema ryoi Endo, 1998
 Calodema sainvali Nylander, 2000
 Calodema suhandae Nylander, 2004
 Calodema vicksoni Nylander, 2006
 Calodema wallacei wallacei Deyrolle, 1864
 Calodema wallacei meeki Grasso, Vodoz & Menufandu, 2021

References

Buprestidae genera